Ioannis "Giannis" Okkas (Greek: Ιωάννης «Γιάννης» Οκκάς; born 11 February 1977) is a retired Cypriot striker and a football manager. He was also the captain of the National Team of Cyprus for many years and he is the 2nd leading scorer of all time just behind Michalis Konstantinou, scoring in total 27 goals for Cyprus. With 106 national caps since 1997, Okkas has made more appearances for Cyprus than any other player in history.

Club career
Okkas started his career with Nea Salamis in the 1993–94 season, aged 17. He scored the second goal in Anorthosis' 3–1 win against Apollon Limassol for the 1997–98 Cypriot Cup final. In the summer of 1997 he transferred to Anorthosis Famagusta for a reported fee of £350,000. In 2000 Okkas signed for Greek Super League club PAOK for a reported 900 million greek drachmas. In 2003 Okkas signed for AEK Athens. After being release from his AEK contract, due to the club's financial problems, Okkas signed for Olympiacos. His league debut for Olympiacos was marked by Okkas' scoring the very first goal for Olympiacos, in the newly built Karaiskakis Stadium. 

In 2007, after trials at West Ham United and Derby County, Okkas became the first Cypriot player to move to Spain, signing a contract with Celta Vigo. In 2008, he returned to Cyprus to play for Omonia. Okkas was released from Omonoia, in June 2009, after confronting manager Takis Lemonis on his playing position. In 2009, he returned to Anorthosis, signing a three-year contract with the club. After being released by Anorthosis, Ermis Aradippou became the fourth, and last, team, Okkas would play in the Cypriot First Division. He debuted for Ermis, in an away defeat against APOEL. In his second match for Ermis, Okkas scored twice to help the club get past ENP.

Stats

International career
Okkas debuted for Cyprus on 15 February 1997 in a friendly 2–3 home loss against Poland. He made his competitive debut in a match against Russia, on 29 March 1997, for the 1998 World Cup qualifying stage. Four days later he scored his first goal for Cyprus in a 4–1 away defeat against Bulgaria.

He scored three goals in his side's failed attempts to qualify for the 2002 World Cup, and was also on target in Euro 2004's qualifying stage, notably against France, in which Cyprus lost 1–2, but with fine displays from Okkas, including a delicate chip that left French keeper Grégory Coupet completely stranded.

On 15 November 2006, Okkas netted in a surprising Euro 2008 qualifier draw with giants Germany. He started captaining the national squad since the 2006 FIFA World Cup.

On 8 October 2010, Okkas reached 100 appearances for Cyprus national football team in a 1–2 home loss against Norway, in match that he managed to score his 26th goal for Cyprus.

On 11 October 2011, he played for the last time with the national side, in UEFA Euro 2012 qualifying Group H match against Norway in Ullevaal Stadion, Oslo, where he scored his last goal for the Cypriot national team. After fifteen full playing years as the captain for Cyprus, Okkas announced his retirement from international football on 2 March 2012. At the time of his retirement Okkas was the most capped player for Cyprus and the second all-time scorer.

International goals

|}

Trivia
For two consecutive years, Okkas scored the first league goal of the season in Greece, with AEK in 2003–04 and Olympiacos the next season.

Coaching career
After retiring as a professional football player, Okkas was appointed as an assistant manager in Ermis Aradippou. In March 2015 he replaced Mitchell van der Gaag as manager of Ermis Aradippou. He was dismissed from his position at Ermis on 11 May.

Honours
Anorthosis
Cypriot First Division: 1997–98, 1998–99, 1999–2000
Cypriot Cup: 1997–98 
Cypriot Super Cup: 1998, 1999

PAOK
Greek Football Cup: 2000–01, 2002–03

Olympiacos
Greek Superleague: 2004–05, 2005–06, 2006–07
Greek Football Cup: 2004–05, 2005–06

Individual
PAOK MVP of the Season: 2001–2002, 2002–2003

See also 
 List of men's footballers with 100 or more international caps

References

External links

Stats and profile at zerozero.pt

1977 births
Living people
Greek Cypriot people
People from Larnaca
Cypriot footballers
Cyprus international footballers
Cypriot expatriate footballers
Cypriot expatriate sportspeople in Greece
Cypriot expatriate sportspeople in Spain
Association football forwards
Anorthosis Famagusta F.C. players
PAOK FC players
AEK Athens F.C. players
Nea Salamis Famagusta FC players
Olympiacos F.C. players
RC Celta de Vigo players
AC Omonia players
Expatriate footballers in Spain
Expatriate footballers in Greece
Cypriot First Division players
Super League Greece players
Segunda División players
FIFA Century Club
Ermis Aradippou FC players
Cypriot football managers
Ermis Aradippou FC managers